I Married Wyatt Earp is a 1983 American Western television film directed by Michael O'Herlihy. The film premiered January 10, 1983, on NBC. It is based on Josephine Earp's memoir of the same name and stars Marie Osmond as Josie Marcus, Bruce Boxleitner as Wyatt Earp, and John Bennett Perry as Johnny Behan.

Plot
The movie tells the story of Josie Marcus (Marie Osmond), a young opera singer from San Francisco, who heads out west, where she meets, falls in love with, and marries legendary lawman Wyatt Earp (Bruce Boxleitner).

Cast
 Marie Osmond as Josephine "Josie" Marcus
 Bruce Boxleitner as Wyatt Earp
 John Bennett Perry as Johnny Behan
 Jeffrey De Munn as Doc Holliday
 Allison Arngrim as Amy
 Ross Martin as Jacob Spiegler
 Ron Manning as Virgil Earp
 Josef Rainer as Morgan Earp
 Charles Benton as Ike Clanton
 Earl W. Smith as Frank Stillwell

Production

Development
The University of Arizona Press published the memoir I Married Wyatt Earp in 1976, listing the author as Josephine Earp, and edited by Glenn Boyer. Some critics questioned Boyer's sources for the book, but Stephen Cox, then director of the University of Arizona Press, told the Arizona Daily Star in July 1998 that he stood behind the authenticity of the book. It is the second best-selling book about Western Deputy U.S. Marshal Wyatt Earp ever sold.

Filming
The TV movie was filmed in 1981 but not broadcast until 1983. It is Ross Martin's final performance.

References

External links
 

1983 television films
1990s English-language films
American Western (genre) television films
Biographical films about Wyatt Earp
Cultural depictions of Wyatt Earp
Cultural depictions of Doc Holliday
Drama films based on actual events
Films set in Texas
Films set in the 1880s
Films set in Tombstone, Arizona
NBC network original films
Films directed by Michael O'Herlihy